Trechimorphus is a genus of beetles in the family Carabidae, containing the following species:

 Trechimorphus apterus Moore, 1972
 Trechimorphus brunneus Moore, 1972
 Trechimorphus diemenensis (Bates, 1878)
 Trechimorphus semipunctatus Moore, 1972
 Trechimorphus solidior (Blackburn, 1901)
 Trechimorphus westraliensis Moore, 1972

References

Trechinae